The Dixiebelles were an American girl group briefly popular in the early 1960s.  Their best-known single, "(Down at) Papa Joe's", hit #9 on the Billboard Hot 100 late in 1963, and the follow-up, "Southtown U.S.A.", hit #15 early in 1964.  Both these songs were 
produced by Bill Justis and released on Sound Stage 7 Records, a division of Monument Records.  The name of the group is one word - The Dixiebelles - as listed on their records.

On record (at least for their first single, "(Down at) Papa Joe's"), The Dixiebelles were in fact all members of the Anita Kerr Singers.  

Based in Memphis, Tennessee, the Dixiebelles touring group had all previously sung backup in various capacities.  Several members had been in The Tonettes, who recorded one single for the Stax Records subsidiary Volt in 1962.

A full-length Dixiebelles album was released, but a third single ("New York Town") failed to hit the Hot 100, peaking at just #119 on Billboard's "Bubbling Under" chart.  Shortly thereafter, their contract with Sound Stage 7 ended and they never released another single.

Several members of the touring group later turned up in The Charmels, a group that recorded four non-hit singles for Stax between 1966 and 1968.

Thomas died on May 9, 2018, at age 74.

Members
Mary Hunt
Mildred Pratcher
Shirley Thomas (July 23, 1943 – May 9, 2018)

References

American girl groups
African-American girl groups
Monument Records artists
Musical groups from Memphis, Tennessee